Frank Nugent Freeman (April 17, 1880 – October 17, 1961) was a Canadian-born American educational psychologist. He taught at the University of Chicago from 1909 to 1939, and served as dean of the University of California, Berkeley's Graduate School of Education from then until 1948. Among his most notable books are Mental Tests: Their History, Principles and Applications (1926) and Twins: A Study of Heredity and Environment (1937).

References

External links

20th-century American psychologists
1880 births
1961 deaths
Canadian emigrants to the United States
Educational psychologists
Wesleyan University alumni
Yale University alumni
University of Chicago faculty
University of California, Berkeley Graduate School of Education faculty
People from Wellington County, Ontario
American educational psychologists